The Barents Euro-Arctic Council (BEAC) is the official body for inter-governmental co-operation in the Barents Region. It seeks solutions wherever and whenever the countries can achieve more together than by working on their own. Cooperation in the Barents Euro-Arctic Region was launched in 1993 on two levels: intergovernmental Barents Euro-Arctic Council (BEAC) and interregional Barents Regional Council (BRC). The overall objective of Barents cooperation has been sustainable development.

In 2008, the International Barents Secretariat was established in Kirkenes. The secretariat supports the multilateral activities within the Barents Euro-Arctic Council and Barents Regional Council and secures the coherence and efficiency of the cooperation. The IBS maintains the archives of the Barents Euro-Arctic council and the Barents Regional Council and works as an information database.

Where appropriate, there is also coordination with the relevant activities of the Nordic Council of Ministers,  the Council of the Baltic Sea States,  the Arctic Council and  the Northern Dimension.

History 
During the Cold War the Barents region was an area of military confrontation. The underlying premise was that close cooperation secures political long-term stability and reduces possible tensions. This objective has already been successfully achieved. The Barents cooperation has fostered a new sense of unity and closer contact among the people of the region which is an excellent basis for further progress.

Kirkenes Declaration 
BEAC was founded at the conference on cooperation in the Barents Euro-Arctic Region took place in Kirkenes (Norway) on 11 January 1993 in accordance with the Kirkenes Declaration of 1993. The Ministers of Foreign Affairs or representatives of Denmark, Finland, Iceland, Norway, the Russian Federation, Sweden and the Commission of the European Communities participated in the conference, which was also attended by observers from the United States of America, Canada, France, Germany, Japan, Poland, and the United Kingdom. The BEAC was created  in order to provide impetus to existing cooperation and consider new initiatives and proposals. The objective of the work of the council is to promote sustainable development in the Barents region, bearing in mind the principles and recommendations set out in the Rio Declaration and Agenda 21 of UNCED.

The regional representatives together with a representative from the indigenous peoples signed a co-operation protocol establishing the Barents Regional Council (BRC) to support the cooperation in the Barents region in regional level at the same time as the BEAC was established. The aim of the BRC is to cooperate in the regional level following the Kirkenes Declaration.

Barents Euro-Arctic Council

Members 
 Denmark
 Finland
 Iceland
 Norway
 Russia
 Sweden
 European Commission

Observers to BEAC 
 Canada
 France
 Germany
 Italy
 Japan
 Netherlands
 Poland
 United Kingdom
 United States of America

Chairmanship 
The chairmanship of the Barents Euro-Arctic Council rotates between Finland, Norway, Russia and Sweden. Finland holds the chairmanship for the period 2021–2023.

Ministerial Meetings 
Ministers of the four Barents countries (Norway, Sweden, Finland, Russia) have met regularly since the Kirkenes Declaration in 1993. The BEAC Foreign Minister's Sessions is the highest decision-making body in the whole Barents cooperation. Foreign ministers meet biannually with the transferring the BEAC Chairmanship to the next country. The XVIII BEAC Foreign Ministers' meeting took place in Tromsø, Norway on 26 October 2021. Also Prime Ministers, Ministers of Environment, Transport, Culture, Competitiveness and Health have met and discussed topical issues. The meeting documents and joint declarations can be found here.

Committee of Senior Officials 
The Committee of Senior Officials (CSO) is the BEAC body responsible for coordinating the cooperation activities and organizing the work within BEAC between the meetings at the Foreign Minister level. The CSO is represented by the civil servants from the governments of the member states and the European Union. Representatives of the observer countries have the right to participate. The CSO meets on a regular basis 4-5 times per year in the country holding the Chairmanship of the BEAC. The Chairperson of the CSO is a representative of the government of the chair country.

Barents Regional Council (BRC)

Members 

 Finland: Kainuu, Lapland, Oulu, North Karelia
 Norway: Nordland, Troms, Finnmark
 Russia: Arkhangelsk, Karelia, Komi, Murmansk, Nenets
 Sweden: Norrbotten, Västerbotten

Observers 

 Council of Christian Churches in the Barents Region
 Parliamentary Association of North West Russia

The BRC unites fourteen counties or similar sub-national entities from the Barents Region and the chairmanship of the BRC rotates between these counties. Nenets, Russia, is the chair of the BRC for the period 2021–2023.

Chairmanship 
The chairmanship rotates biennially between participating regions in Finland, Norway, the Russian Federation and Sweden.

Meetings and Priorities 
The BRC meets twice a year and is composed of the highest regional representatives of the participating regions as well as representatives of all three groups of indigenous peoples of the Barents region. Regional Committee (RC) prepares the meetings. RC consists of civil servants from member counties.

Priorities for the regional cooperation are identified in the Barents Program which is a framework for the inter-regional Barents cooperation. The program is an operational framework to strengthen the Barents cooperation and offer a joint platform to maintain stable development and people-to-people cooperation in the North.

Working groups 
The two councils have established thematic Working Groups. The Working Groups constitute a cross-border platform for exchange between civil servants and professionals in respective field both on the national and regional level. Over the past years, the Working Groups have also implemented several projects.

Working Group of Indigenous Peoples 
The representatives of the three indigenous peoples, the Sámi, the Nenets and the Vepsians, cooperate in the Working Group of Indigenous Peoples (WGIP). It has an advisory role in both the BEAC and the BRC which means that their participation is welcome in all Barents Working Groups. The WGIP Chair is also member of the Committee of Senior Officials (CSO) and the Barents Regional Committee, and that they are always represented at the BEAC Ministerial Sessions and the Barents Regional Council meetings.

Barents Regional Youth Council 

Barents Regional Youth Council (BRYC) consists of youth representatives from Northern regions of Finland, Norway, Russia and Sweden and has an indigenous youth representative from one of the indigenous peoples of the Barents Region. BRYC promotes the interests of young people living in the Barents region. It aims to strengthen people-to-people cooperation and empower young people to participate actively. BRYC members are elected by youth councils or chosen by their county administration. The council meets two times a year to discuss youth activities of the region. BRYC Annual Meeting and Annual Event are the main activities of the BRYC.

List of the BEAC Working Groups 
 Health and Social Issues
 Education and Research
 Culture
 Forest Sector
 Tourism
 Transport and Logistics
 Business Co-operation
 Environment
 Youth Issues
 Rescue Co-operation
 Indigenous Peoples
 Barents Regional Youth Council

Practical Cooperation in the Working Groups

Barents Scholarship for Cultural Cooperation 

Barents Scholarship for Cultural Cooperation was established by the Ministers of Culture of the Barents Euro-Arctic Council in 2016. The scholarships have been awarded in Arkhangelsk in 2017, in Umeå in 2019 and in Tromsø in 2021, once per BEAC presidency. Scholarships are awarded to professional artists and artistic associations within the cultural field in the Barents region. Scholarships are based on an overall assessment of experience and ambitions, artistic quality in previous work and Barents affiliation.

Barents Environmental Hot Spots 
Barents environmental hot spots are major polluters and issues imposing environmental hazards to surrounding communities and nature. The hot spot list from 2003 consists of 42 hot spots from various sectors such as mining and metallurgy, pulp and paper, water and wastewater located in the Russian part of the Barents region. In 2005 Environment Ministers of the four Barents countries defined a goal to launch investment projects in all Barents Environmental Hot Spots aiming to eliminate them. Subgroup on Hot Spots Exclusion was established under the Working Group on Environment to facilitate the process. Significant environmental improvements have been achieved and 12 full hot spots and 3 partial ones have been eliminated. Work at other sites is being continued.

Nature protection and water issues 
The Subgroup on Nature and Water (SNW) works with biodiversity conservation, protected areas, sustainable forestry management, sustainable management of water resources and water use, transboundary water bodies, mitigation and adaptation to climate change and ecosystem approach. Work is based on projects.

Rescue Cooperation 
Aim of the Barents rescue cooperation is to improve the possibilities of the rescue service agencies to cooperate across the national, federal and regional borders on emergency and rescue issues. It is possible to provide assistance more effectively, faster and at lower operating cost in the region of long distances, sparsely populated rural communities, limited rescue personnel and equipment, restricted means for transport and hospital resources available in case of larger accidents. Agreement on Cooperation within the field of Emergency Prevention, Preparedness and Response defines the objectives and scope of the cooperation. The Committee has developed the Barents Joint Rescue Manual which is the operational tool of the rescue cooperation. Rescue cooperation is practiced in the Barents Rescue Exercises organized every third year.

See also 
Homepage – Barents Euro-Arctic Council
Homepage – Barents Regional Youth Council
Intergovernmental organization

References 

Barents Sea
Intergovernmental organizations